Taekwondo at the 2019 Pacific Games was held on 16–18 July 2019 in Apia, Samoa.

Medal summary

Medal table

Men

Eight individual weight classes for men plus a men's team event was contested.

Women

Eight individual weight classes for women plus a women's team event was contested.

See also
 Taekwondo at the Pacific Games

References

2019
2019 Pacific Games
Pacific Games